The 2011 Brasileiro de Marcas season was the debut season of the Brasileiro de Marcas. It begin on June 19 at the Tarumã and ended on December 4 at the Curitiba, after sixteen races. For the first seasons some teams have the support of manufactures, Carlos Alves Competições and AMG Motorsport by Chevrolet, Amir Nasr Racing and Officer ProGP by Ford and Full Time Sports by Honda.

Chevrolet driver Thiago Camilo claimed the championship with a last race of the season,
Camilo  claimed six victories. Honda driver Daniel Serra finished in second place and Fabio Carbone in third. Chevrolet won the Manufacturers' Championship with a margin of twenty-six points by Honda.

Teams and drivers
All drivers were Brazilian-registered.

Race calendar and results
All races were held in Brazil.

Championship standings
Points were awarded as follows:

Drivers' Championship

Notes:
† — Driver not racing, but scored points by compete with partner.

Manufacturers' Championship

Teams' Championship

References

External links
 

Marcas
Brasileiro de Marcas seasons